Lawrence Hyde (ca. 1610 – September 1682) was a Royalist Member of Parliament for Winchester from 1661 to 1679.

He was a younger son of Nicholas Hyde, MP for several seats and later Lord Chief Justice of England. His cousin was Edward Hyde, the Lord Chancellor. In 1652 he married Anne, daughter of Sir John Glanville the younger, who had been Speaker of the House of Commons.

References

1610 births
1682 deaths
Politics of Winchester
Cavaliers
English MPs 1661–1679
People from Catherington